Entoria is a genus of stick insects in the tribe Clitumnini, erected by Carl Stål in 1875.  Species have been recorded from: China, Japan, Indochina and the Philippines.

Species
The Phasmida Species File lists:
 Entoria baishanzuensis Chen & He, 1995
 Entoria banshoryoensis Shiraki, 1935
 Entoria bituberculata Bi, 1993
 Entoria continentalis Carl, 1913
 Entoria cornuta Ho, 2013
 Entoria denticornis Stål, 1875 - type species
 Entoria domonensis Shiraki, 1935
 Entoria formosana Shiraki, 1911
 Entoria fujianensis Cai & Liu, 1990
 Entoria fuzhouensis Cai & Liu, 1990
 Entoria gracilis Bi, 1993
 Entoria guangdongensis Ho, 2015
 Entoria hainanensis Cai & Liu, 1990
 Entoria hei Ho, 2013
 Entoria heishidingensis Ho, 2015
 Entoria humilis Bi, 1993
 Entoria ishigakiensis Shiraki, 1935
 Entoria japonica Shiraki, 1911
 Entoria kiirunensis Shiraki, 1935
 Entoria koshunensis Shiraki, 1935
 Entoria laminata Cai & Liu, 1990
 Entoria longiopercula Shiraki, 1935
 Entoria magna Shiraki, 1911
 Entoria miyakoensis Shiraki, 1935
 Entoria nuda Brunner von Wattenwyl, 1907
 Entoria shinchikuensis Shiraki, 1935
 Entoria sichuanensis Cai & Liu, 1990
 Entoria taihokuensis Shiraki, 1935
 Entoria taitoensis Shiraki, 1935
 Entoria takaoensis Shiraki, 1935
 Entoria victoria Brock & Seow-Choen, 2000
 Entoria wuyiensis Cai & Liu, 1990
 Entoria wuzhishanense (Chen & Li, 2002)

References

External links

Images at iNaturalist

Phasmatodea genera
Phasmatodea of Asia
Phasmatidae